Randolph Channing Crowder Sr. (born July 30, 1952) is a former American football defensive lineman in the NFL. He played three seasons with the Miami Dolphins and three with the Tampa Bay Buccaneers. He attended Penn State University, where he was named All-America in 1973. Retiring from the NFL after the 1982 season, he was the Defensive Line Coach at Penn State University for 2 years.

On August 12, 1977, a judge sentenced two former Miami Dolphin players to one year in jail for selling cocaine from their arrest on May 4, 1977. Randy Crowder and Don Reese, who admitted selling a pound of cocaine to an undercover policeman, pleaded no contest and Circuit Judge Joseph Durant withheld adjudication as part of a plea-bargaining agreement.

Personal life
Crowder married Pauline Pope. They had three children, one of whom is former Dolphins linebacker Channing Crowder.

References
 

1952 births
American football defensive linemen
Living people
Miami Dolphins players
Penn State Nittany Lions football players
Tampa Bay Buccaneers players
People from Mercer County, Pennsylvania
Players of American football from Pennsylvania